ACM Gold & Forex Trading is a South African-based financial brokerage house established in 2004. The company was founded by Irfan Pardesi and Hina Kassam in the United Kingdom. ACM is the abbreviation of Accentuate Capital Markets and commonly referred to as ACM Gold, having offices all around the globe, with major presence in Asia, Africa and the Middle East and some parts of Eastern Europe. ACM Gold offers trading in CFDs (Contract for Differences) & Spot Products for Foreign Exchange, Indices, Metals, Energy and Commodities.

ACM Gold & Forex Trading is known to tap into emerging markets and its strategy involves opening up offices in untapped financial avenues. ACM Gold holds offices in South Africa, Nigeria, Pakistan, United Arab Emirates, Tanzania, Kenya, Malaysia, India, Macedonia, Croatia and has also recently ventured in Botswana.

Regulations

ACM Gold & Forex Trading is regulated and licensed by the Financial Services Board in South Africa. It is also licensed by Financial Services Commission of Mauritius. In addition to this, ACM Gold is a Trading-Cum-Clearing Member of Global Board of Trade. In Pakistan,  ACM Gold (Pvt.) Ltd. operates as a member of Pakistan Mercantile Exchange and is regulated with Securities Exchange Commission, Pakistan. In 2014, ACM Gold got the NBFIRA license to start operations in Botswana.

Awards

Best African Forex Broker at Middle East & North Africa (MENA) 2012 Managed Funds and Investment Opportunities Summit organized by Arabcom. 
Best African Forex Broker awarded by World Finance
Best African Forex Broker, Nigeria in 2013 and 2014
Best African Forex Broker, Global Banking and Finance Awards. 2014

References

External links

Financial services companies established in 2004
Companies based in Johannesburg
Financial services companies of South Africa
South African companies established in 2004